Gazeta Basarabiei was a newspaper from Chișinău, Bessarabia, founded in 1923.

Overview

Between 24 October and 17 November 1923, Gazeta Basarabiei was a weekly of the Romanian National Party, edited by Ion Pelivan and Constantin Mâțu. A publication of the same name, Gazeta Basarabiei, was founded in 1935.

References

Bibliography 
 Constantin Mâțu, O necessitate desconsiderată: Presa românească în Basarabia, Chișinău, 1930.
 Eugen Ștefan Holban, Dicționar cronologic: Prin veacurile învolburate ale Moldovei dintre Prut și Nistru, Chișinău, 1998.

External links 
 PRESA BASARABEANĂ de la începuturi pînă în anul 1957. Catalog

Publications established in 1923
Publications disestablished in 1923
Newspapers published in Moldova
Romanian-language newspapers published in Moldova
Mass media in Chișinău